Yeoveney Halt was a railway platform of a minimalist nature on the Staines & West Drayton Railway (which became part of the Great Western Railway in 1900). It was opened in June 1887 as Runnymede Range Halt on a restricted basis (as a private facility for a nearby rifle range), gaining a regular public service from 1 March 1892. It was renamed Runymede Halt on 9 July 1934, and again renamed Yeoveney Halt on 4 November 1935, to deter tourists who came seeking the place where Magna Carta was signed (which was some distance away by road). It closed on 14 May 1962, before the 1965 closure of the branch.

It comprised a short timber platform on the west side of the single track with no shelter. Bradshaw stated that passengers wishing to join the train had to give the driver the necessary (but unspecified) hand signal. Those wishing to alight were to inform the guard at the previous station.

Contrary to the general belief that the site of the station lies beneath the M25 motorway it can be identified by the remaining scattered concrete platform support pillars in the location shown on old Ordnance Survey maps.

Pictures of the station are to be found in
 GWR Country Stations 2:  C.Leigh 1984 Ian Allan  
 London's Local Railways:  A.A.Jackson 2nd Ed 1999 Capital Transport Publishing 
 Branch Lines of West London: V. Mitchell & K. Smith 2000 Middleton Press

References

External links
 Yeoveney Halt on navigable O.S. map

Disused railway stations in Surrey
Former Great Western Railway stations
Railway stations in Great Britain opened in 1887
Railway stations in Great Britain closed in 1962
Borough of Spelthorne